Jostedal may refer to:

Places
Jostedal, a former municipality in Sogn og Fjordane county, Norway
Jostedalen, a valley in Luster municipality in Sogn og Fjordane county, Norway
Jostedal Glacier, a large glacier in Sogn og Fjordane county, Norway
Jostedal Church, a church in Luster municipality in Sogn og Fjordane county, Norway
Jostedalsbreen National Park, a national park in Sogn og Fjordane county, Norway